The Mine Workers' Union or Mineworkers' Union is the name of:

 Andhra Pradesh Mica Mine Workers Union, current trade union in India
 Canadian Mineworkers Union, former trade union
 Ghana Mine Workers' Union, current trade union
 Mine Workers' Union of Canada, former trade union
 Mineworkers Union of Namibia, current trade union
 Mine Workers' Union (South Africa), former name of current trade union
 Northern Rhodesian African Mineworkers' Union, former trade union
 United Mine Workers Union, current trade union in the United States

See also
 National Union of Mineworkers (disambiguation)